Patenga is a thana of Chattogram District in Chattogram Division, Bangladesh.

Education

According to Banglapedia, BAF Shaheen College, Chittagong, Chittagong Steel Mills High School, Eastern Refinery Model High School, Patenga High School, and Rangamati Government High School are notable secondary schools.

See also 
Upazilas of Bangladesh
Districts of Bangladesh
Divisions of Bangladesh

References 

Thanas of Chittagong District